The Women's 15 kilometre pursuit event of the FIS Nordic World Ski Championships 2015 was held on 21 February 2015.

Results
The race was started at 13:00.

References

Women's 15 kilometre pursuit
2015 in Swedish women's sport